Lac de l'Assencière is a lake at Châtel-de-Joux in the Jura department of France. The lake is part of the preserve "Complexe des bois et du lac de l'Assencière".

References
   

Assenciere